Pikul may refer to:

Picul, a Javanese traditional unit of weight
Pikul (EP), an EP by Silversun Pickups
Joseph Pikul, American businessman linked to the 1987 death of Diane Whitmore Pikul
Valentin Pikul, Russian novelist